Lopatki is a rural locality (a selo) in Beryozovskoye Rural Settlement, Ramonsky District, Voronezh Oblast, Russia. The population was 358 as of 2010. There are 8 streets.

Geography 
Lopatki is located 12 km north of Ramon (the district's administrative centre) by road. Borki is the nearest rural locality.

References 

Rural localities in Ramonsky District